Parliamentary elections were held in Iceland on 23 April 1983. The Independence Party remained the largest party in the Lower House of the Althing, winning 15 of the 40 seats.

Results

By constituency

Notes

References

Elections in Iceland
Iceland
Parliament
1983 election
Iceland